Pervirella Original Motion Picture Soundtrack and Other Exotic Entertainment Tunes is the Soundtrack for the film Pervirella.

History
The rock and roll-Victorian-erotic-horror-soundtrack featured composition from jazz, surf rock, garage rock, lounge, easy listening and psychedelic rock.

Track listing
 Alessandro Alessandroni - Desert Theme
 François Evans & London Gay Symphony Orchestra - Pervirella Main Title
 Les Hommes Qui Adorent Les Femmes - Sexy Amazonas 
 François Evans & London Gay Symphony Orchestra - Journey to Oshimina 
 François Evans & London Gay Symphony Orchestra - Museum of Curiosities
 François Evans & London Gay Symphony Orchestra - Amicus Reilly 
 François Evans & London Gay Symphony Orchestra - Airship Departs 
 François Evans & London Gay Symphony Orchestra - Baby Grows/The Magic Carpet Ride
 The Diaboliks - Ninja a Go Go
 Dave Kraft Five - Lavinina's Theme 
 Frat Shack All-Stars - Let's All Go to the Frat Shack  
 Frat Shack All-Stars - Mad Juicer
 Frat Shack All-Stars - Buggered Bunny
 The Adventures of Parsley - The Flying Car
 The Constellations - Rumpy Pumpy
 Baine Watson Orchestra  - Dog Gas
 Toe Rag All-Stars with Dave Kraft - Lavinia's Theme
 Sexton Ming and the Diamond Gussetts - The Sake of Pleasure
 Bradley Ghoulstein Combo - Bottles of Blood
 Bradley Ghoulstein Combo - Jungle Stitches
 Bradley Ghoulstein Combo - Put It On
 François Evans & The London Gay Symphony Orchestra - Pervirella End Title

Release
It was released on 23 February 1999 over Dionysus Records and was recorded at Toe Rag Studios in London.

Credits
Distributor: Lumberjack-Mordam Music Group
Recording information: Toe Rag Studios, London, England
Editors: Len Horowitz and Lee Joseph at HRS Beverly Hills, CA
Music composed and conducted by François Evans
Manufactured under license from Josh Collins and Exotic Entertainment UK
Arrangers: Josh Collins, Liam Watson, Bruce Brand

References

Film soundtracks
1999 compilation albums
1999 soundtrack albums